Some film directors and actors have collaborated numerous times and have become noteworthy for their partnerships. Note: In some instances, the body of work is too extensive to list all the films on which they worked together.

List of collaborations

References

Actor Collaborations
Collaborations
Film director and actor